Dame Sukhinder Kaur Gill Turner  (born Sukhinder Kaur Gill, 13 April 1952), commonly known as Sukhi Turner, is an Indian-born-New Zealand politician who served as the Mayor of Dunedin, New Zealand, from 1995 until her retirement from the position in 2004. She was also regarded by some as New Zealand's most prominent politician from the country's Indian community.

Early life
Turner was born in Ludhiana, the largest city in the Indian state of Punjab, to Squadron Leader Jasbir Singh Gill and Premjit Kaur on 13 April 1952.

Born as Sukhinder Kaur Gill, she is a Sikh. She attended Bethany College, West Virginia, United States, gaining qualifications in history and political science. She moved to New Zealand after marrying Glenn Turner, a prominent New Zealand cricket player, in July 1973, and became a naturalised New Zealander in August 1973. Sukhi and Glenn Turner settled in Dunedin in 1982. They have two children.

Political career
Turner has taken part in a wide range of community work, focusing particularly on education. She has taken an active role in school committees and associations, and in 1992, successfully stood for election to the Dunedin City Council. After a three-year term on the council, Turner chose to contest the mayoralty, challenging long-serving incumbent Richard Walls. She was successful, and was subsequently re-elected twice. Turner announced that she would retire from the position in October 2004, when her third term expired. She was replaced by Peter Chin. She joined the Green Party of Aotearoa New Zealand in 1995.

In 1993, Turner was awarded the New Zealand Suffrage Centennial Medal.

Life after politics
In the 2002 Queen's Birthday and Golden Jubilee Honours, Turner was appointed a Distinguished Companion of the New Zealand Order of Merit, for services to local government. Following the reinstatement of titular honours by the New Zealand government in 2009, she accepted redesignation as a Dame Companion of the New Zealand Order of Merit.

In early 2004, Turner was among the recipients of the Pravasi Bharatiya Samman, an award given by the Indian government to honour those who have made a significant contribution to Indian immigrant communities in other countries.

References

External links
Official profile
News report after Turner was re-elected for a third term
Reasons for award of Pravasi Bharatiya Samman

1952 births
Living people
Indian emigrants to New Zealand
Mayors of Dunedin
New Zealand Sikhs
Politicians from Ludhiana
New Zealand people of Punjabi descent
Green Party of Aotearoa New Zealand politicians
Women mayors of places in New Zealand
Bethany College (West Virginia) alumni
Dames Companion of the New Zealand Order of Merit
Dunedin City Councillors
Naturalised citizens of New Zealand
Recipients of the New Zealand Suffrage Centennial Medal 1993
Recipients of Pravasi Bharatiya Samman